Mincom can refer to:

 The Ministry of Communications of Morocco
 Mincom Limited, an Australian EAM software provider
 The now-defunct Mincom division of 3M, which specialized in magnetic tape recorders for instrumentation and sound recording, and other electronic products